Nathalia Llamosa Mosquera (born 14 June 1997) is a Colombian weightlifter. She won the bronze medal in the women's 64kg event at the 2022 World Weightlifting Championships held in Bogotá, Colombia. She is a four-time medalist, including three gold medals, at the Pan American Weightlifting Championships. She won two medals, including gold, at the 2022 Bolivarian Games held in Valledupar, Colombia.

She won the gold medal in the women's 63 kg Snatch event at the 2018 Central American and Caribbean Games held in Barranquilla, Colombia. She finished in 4th place in the Clean & Jerk.

She won the gold medal in the women's 64kg event at the 2022 South American Games held in Asunción, Paraguay.

Achievements

References

External links 
 

Living people
1997 births
Place of birth missing (living people)
Colombian female weightlifters
Pan American Weightlifting Championships medalists
World Weightlifting Championships medalists
Central American and Caribbean Games medalists in weightlifting
Central American and Caribbean Games gold medalists for Colombia
Competitors at the 2018 Central American and Caribbean Games
South American Games gold medalists for Colombia
South American Games medalists in weightlifting
Competitors at the 2022 South American Games
21st-century Colombian women